Elena Ceaușescu (7 January 1916 – 25 December 1989) was a Romanian communist politician who was the wife of Nicolae Ceaușescu, General Secretary of the Romanian Communist Party and leader of the Socialist Republic of Romania. She was also the Deputy Prime Minister of Romania.

Background
She was born Lenuța Petrescu into a peasant family in Petrești commune, Dâmbovița County, in the historical region of Wallachia. Her father worked as a ploughman. She was able to acquire only an elementary school level education. After elementary school, she moved along with her brother to Bucharest, where she worked as a laboratory assistant before finding employment in a textile factory. She joined the Bucharest branch of the Romanian Communist Party in 1939 and met 21-year-old Nicolae Ceaușescu. Ceaușescu was instantly attracted to her which, reportedly, made him never look at another woman in a romantic manner. Their relationship was interrupted by Ceaușescu's frequent stints in prison, and they married on 23 December 1947.

Career in government

After the Communists took power, Elena Ceaușescu worked as a secretary in the Ministry of Foreign Affairs and was an unimportant figure until her husband became Communist Party General Secretary. 

Elena Ceaușescu frequently accompanied her husband on official visits abroad. During a state visit to the People's Republic of China in June 1971, she took note of how Jiang Qing, Chairman Mao Zedong's wife, maintained a position of power. Most likely inspired by this, she began to engineer her own political rise in Romania. In July 1971, after a mini-cultural revolution launched by her husband, she was elected a member of the Central Commission on Socio-Economic Forecasting. Starting in July 1972, Elena Ceaușescu started getting various offices at senior levels in the Romanian Communist Party. In July 1972, she became a full member of the Romanian Communist Party Central Committee. In June 1973, she became a member of the Politburo of the Romanian Communist Party, becoming the second most important and influential person after her husband. She was deeply involved in party administration alongside her husband, and was one of the few spouses of a Communist Party leader to have a high political profile of her own. In June 1973, after having been nominated by Emil Bodnăraș, she was elected to the party's executive committee. In November 1974, at the 11th Party Congress, she was made a member of the (renamed) political executive committee, and in January 1977, she became a member of the highest party body, the Permanent Bureau of the Political Executive Committee. In March 1975, she was elected to the Great National Assembly, the country's national legislature, holding the seat for Pitești, Argeș County, the most important industrial region of the country, until her death in 1989. In March 1980, she was made a First Deputy Prime Minister, a state title she held until she was executed in the Romanian Revolution.

From the early 1980s onward, Elena was the object of a personality cult as intense as that of her husband, which exalted her as the "Mother of the Nation". By all accounts, her vanity and desire for honours exceeded that of her husband. As with her husband, Romanian Television was under strict orders to take great care portraying her on screen. For instance, she was never supposed to be shown in profile because of her large nose and overall homely appearance.

Fall from power

Ceaușescu fled with her husband on 22 December 1989, after the events in Timișoara led to the Romanian Revolution, but she and her husband were captured in the town of Târgoviște.  At the show trial that took place, she answered only a few questions since her husband took a protective role, asked her to calm down, and shook his head each time her mouth opened to reply in anger.

Execution

On the afternoon of 25 December 1989 in Târgoviște, they were turned over to a firing squad and executed. Her arms, and those of her husband, were tied behind their backs. Their actual execution happened so quickly that a military journalist videoing the trial captured only the last round of bullets and the crumpled bodies on the floor. The aftermath, including echoes of the final volley, the pall of smoke, and the bodies immediately afterward, were also caught on camera. She was 73 years old. She was the only woman ever executed by the modern state of Romania.

Ceaușescu was outlived by her mother, a near centenarian at the time of her death, her brother Gheorghe Petrescu (also an important figure in the party) and her three children: Valentin (b. 1948), Zoia (1949–2006) and Nicu (1951–1996). Nicu was an important member of the Romanian Communist Party, unlike his siblings. Elena Ceaușescu was buried in Ghencea Cemetery.

Reputation as a chemistry researcher
After graduating from primary school in her village and moving to Bucharest, Ceaușescu continued her education in the 1950s through night courses at the local Politechnic, obtaining a bachelor's degree in chemistry. Later, she was promoted as a scientist, and was also awarded a PhD in chemistry.

Since the Revolutions of 1989, several scientists have claimed that Ceaușescu had forced them to write papers in her name, and that the university gave her the honour of the doctorate solely because of her political position.

According to a 1984 report by Radio Free Europe: "It is rumoured that, at the time when she wanted to receive her doctorate from the Bucharest Faculty of Chemistry, she met with strong opposition from the Romanian chemist Costin D. Nenițescu, the Dean of the faculty. The dissertation is titled the "Stereospecific Polymerization of Isoprene" and has substantial scientific value, being still bought  and cited today. Elena Ceausescu went to school only up to 4th grade, which she failed, and thus it is implausible for her to have written the dissertation in 1967. The real authors remain anonymous, but indirect evidence points to a group of brilliant Romanian chemists lead by Dr. Ozias Solomon; professor Solomon was a renowned chemist and he was forced to publish with Elena Ceausescu before. 

She was sometimes nicknamed Codoi, referring to her alleged mispronunciation of the name of the chemical compound CO (C for carbon, O for oxygen, and "" being Romanian for "two"). She was mocked by many, including an official who called her by this nickname during her show trial. Contributing to the humorous effect, "" is an actual word in Romanian, meaning "big tail".In 1957, she was hired as a research scientist at ICECHIM (National Institute for Chemical Research). In the early 1960s, she was reported to be secretary of the party committee of the Bucharest Central Institute of Chemical Researches, and when her husband took over the party leadership in March 1965, she was listed as the institute's director. In December of the same year, she was elected a member of the newly established National Council of Scientific Research, and in September 1966, she was awarded the Order of Scientific Merit First Class. In March 1974, she was made a member of the Romanian Academy's Section for Chemical Sciences. Ceaușescu was given many honorary awards for scientific achievement in the field of polymer chemistry during the period when her husband ruled Romania. She is named as co-inventor on a number of patents, but many scientists claim she forced them to share credit on the patents. 

A group of Romanian scientists are trying to revoke Ceaușescu's scientific credentials and argue that her work is still being cited in modern, genuine scientific papers and influences current research despite Ceaușescu reportedly being "barely literate in science". In 1978, during Nicolae Ceaușescu's state visit to the United Kingdom, The Royal Institute of Chemistry admitted Elena Ceaușescu into membership as a Fellow. The Royal Society of Chemistry, the Royal Institute's successor later clarified that Ceaușescu's membership had been revoked during the Romanian Revolution of 1989. Also, patents under her name are still kept by the European Patent Office.

Honours
 Iran: Commemorative Medal of the 2500th Anniversary of the founding of the Persian Empire (14 October 1971).
 Italy: Dame Grand Cross of the Order of Merit of the Italian Republic (21 May 1973).
 Argentina: Dame Grand Cross of the Order of the Liberator General San Martín (1974).
 Portuguese Republic: Dame Grand Collar of the Order of Prince Henry (12 June 1975).
 Philippines: Order of Gabriela Silang (9 April 1975).
 Malaysia: Honorary Grand Commander of the Order of the Defender of the Realm (1984)

Honorary degree and professorship

Elena Ceaușescu was an Honorary Doctor of several universities and was a member of some academic societies in the United States and countries in Asia, Europe, and Africa.

Member of the New York Academy of Sciences (USA, 1973)
Corresponding member of the Academy of Athens (Greece, 1976).
Honorary Doctor Causa of the University of Buenos Aires (Argentina, 1974),
Honorary Doctor Causa of Universidad Nacional del Sur (Bahia Blanca, Argentina, 1974),
Honorary Doctorate degree honoris causa – Philippine Women's University (1975)
Honorary Doctor of Universidad Autónoma de Yucatán (Mexico, 1975),
Honorary Doctor of the University of Tehran (Iran, 1975).
Honorary Member of the International Society of Industrial Chemistry (1970),
Honorary professor at the National University of Engineering (Lima, Peru, 1973).
Honorary Member of the American Institute of Chemists (Washington, D.C., 1973),
Honorary member of the College of Chemists and Chemical Engineers of Costa Rica (San Jose, 1973).
Honorary Member of the Council of the Central University of Ecuador and of the Institute of Natural Sciences of the Central University of Ecuador (Quito, 1973),
Honorary Member of the Mexican Chemical Society (1975),
Honorary Member of the Ghana Academy of Arts and Sciences (1977).
 Honorary Professor – Polytechnic of Central London (1978)

Publications
Research work on synthesis and characterization of macromolecular compounds, Editura Academiei Republicii Socialiste România, 1974
Stereospecific Polymerization of Isoprene, 1982
Nouvelles recherches dans le domaine des composés macromoleculaires, 1984
Dostizheniia v khimii i tekhnologii polimerov, 1988

References

Bibliography 
 John Sweeney. The Life and Evil Times of Nicolae Ceauşescu. 1991
 Edward Behr. Kiss The Hand You Cannot Bite, 1991.

External links

First Ladies of Romania
1916 births
1989 deaths
1989 crimes in Romania
Elena
Deputy Prime Ministers of Romania
Executed politicians
Executed Romanian women
Filmed executions
Members of the Great National Assembly
Titular members of the Romanian Academy
Executed Romanian people
People executed by Romania by firing squad
People from Dâmbovița County
People of the Romanian Revolution
Romanian communists
Textile workers
Recipients of the Order of the Liberator General San Martin
People involved in plagiarism controversies
20th-century executions by Romania
Knights Grand Cross of the Order of Merit of the Italian Republic
Grand Collars of the Order of Prince Henry
20th-century Romanian politicians
20th-century Romanian women politicians
People of the Cold War
Burials at Ghencea Cemetery
People convicted of genocide
Executed communists